Ogar is a surname. Notable people include:

 Jolanta Ogar (born 1982), Polish sailor
 Odeh Ogar (born 1981), Nigerian footballer
 Peter Ogar, Nigerian military administrator
 Petter Øgar (born 1953), Norwegian physician and civil servant
 Simon Ogar Veron (born 1987), Nigerian footballer

See also